This is a list of people associated with Ludwig Maximilian University of Munich in Germany.

Nobel laureates

Nobel Prize in Physics
 Theodor W. Hänsch (Physics 2005; professor, 2001-02 Chairman of the Physics Department)
 Wolfgang Ketterle (Physics 2001; PhD physics 1986)
 Gerd Binnig (Physics 1986; Honorary Professor since 1987; 1987-1995 Director of IBM physics group at LMU Munich)
 Hans Bethe (Physics 1967; PhD)
 Wolfgang Pauli (Physics 1945; PhD)
 Werner Heisenberg (Physics 1932; PhD)
 Gustav Hertz (Physics 1926; student 1907-1908)
 Johannes Stark (Physics 1919; PhD)
 Max Planck (Physics 1918; PhD)
 Max von Laue (Physics 1914; student one semester 1901-02, Privatdozent 1909, Honorary Doctorate)
 Wilhelm Wien (Physics 1911; professor of physics since 1920)
 Wilhelm Conrad Röntgen (Physics 1901; professor chair since 1900)

Nobel Prize in Chemistry
 Gerhard Ertl (Chemistry 2007; student 1958-1959, professor 1973-1986)
 Hartmut Michel (Chemistry 1988; student lab work 1972/73)
 Ernst Otto Fischer (Chemistry 1973; professor 1957-1959; honorary doctorate 1972)
 Otto Hahn (Chemistry 1944; PhD student)
  Adolf Butenandt (Chemistry 1939; professor)
 Richard Kuhn (Chemistry 1938; PhD)
 Peter Debye (Chemistry 1936; PhD)
 Hans Fischer (Chemistry 1930; MD 1908)
 Heinrich Wieland (Chemistry 1927; PhD)
 Richard Adolf Zsigmondy (Chemistry 1925; professor)
 Richard Willstätter (Chemistry 1915; diploma & PhD)
 Eduard Buchner (Chemistry 1907; PhD & professor)
 Adolf von Baeyer (Chemistry 1905; professor)
 Hermann Emil Fischer (Chemistry 1902; professor 1875-1881)

Nobel Prize in Physiology or Medicine
 Günter Blobel (Physiology or Medicine 1999; studied medicine at the University of Munich)
 Bert Sakmann (Physiology or Medicine 1991; medical assistant 1968, MD 1974)
 Karl von Frisch (Physiology or Medicine 1973; student, assistant since 1910 & professor since 1925)
 Feodor Lynen (Physiology or Medicine 1964; student since 1930, PhD Mar. 1937, professor since 1947)
 Hans Adolf Krebs (Physiology or Medicine 1953; student, 1921 transferred to the University of Munich, started his clinical training, 1923 completed his medical exams)
 Otto Loewi (Physiology or Medicine 1936; student)
 Hans Spemann (Physiology or Medicine 1935; 1893-1894 studied at the University of Munich for clinical training)

Nobel Prize in Literature
 Thomas Mann (Literature 1929; student)

Politicians and public figures

Chancellor of Germany
Konrad Adenauer, Chancellor of Germany (1949–1963)

President of Germany
Karl Carstens, President of Germany (1979–1984)
Gustav Heinemann, President of Germany (1969–1974)
Roman Herzog, President of Germany (1994–1999)
Theodor Heuss, President of Germany (1949–1959)

Anti-Nazi resistance activists
Willi Graf, anti-Nazi resistance activist in the White Rose rebellion
Eric Voegelin, anti-Nazi philosopher
Kurt Huber, well known professor during the World War II era; anti-Nazi resistance activist in the White Rose rebellion
Ernst Munzinger, Abwehr Lieutenant Colonel turned anti-Nazi
Christoph Probst, anti-Nazi resistance activist in the White Rose rebellion
Alexander Schmorell, anti-Nazi resistance activist in the White Rose rebellion
Hans Scholl, anti-Nazi resistance activist, leader of the White Rose rebellion
Sophie Scholl, anti-Nazi resistance activist in the White Rose rebellion

Other politicians and public figures
 John Dalberg-Acton, 1st Baron Acton (1834–1902), British historian and politician
Valdas Adamkus, President of Lithuania (1998–2003, 2004–2009)
Jaladat Ali Badirkhan, Kurdish writer, linguist, journalist and political activist
Dora Bakoyannis, Greek Foreign Affairs Minister, outgoing Mayor of Athens
Pope Benedict XVI, Pope (2005–2013) and former theologian
Dr. Diether Haenicke, President of Western Michigan University (1985–1998); Interim President (2006–2007)
Erwin Huber, leader of the Christian Social Union (2007–2009)
Sir Allama Muhammad Iqbal, poet and philosopher of Pakistan
Conrad Krez, member of the Wisconsin State Assembly
King Ludwig III of Bavaria
Birgitt Ory, German Ambassador to Nigeria, former Director General of the German Institute Taipei
Manfred Wörner, Secretary General of NATO (1988–1994)
Michael Zickerick, former German Ambassador to Moldova and Director General of the German Institute Taipei

Other notable alumni
 Andrea Ablasser, immunologist
 Frank Baffoe, Ghanaian economist, diplomat and businessman
 Celadet Bedir Khan, Kurdish politician and writer
 Ingeborg Beling, ethologist in the field of chronobiology
 Werner Braune (1909–1951), Nazi SS officer, executed for war crimes
 Bertolt Brecht, poet, playwright, and theatre director
 Gisela Bulla (1932-2018), archeologist, author, and politician
 William Lane Craig, Christian theologian and philosopher
 Stefan Dassler, author of business-related non-fiction books
 Georg Dohrn, German conductor
 Bernadette Eberlein (born 1964), dermatologist, allergologist, and researcher
 Aloys Fischer, educationalist and statistician
 Wilhelm Frick (1877-1946), Nazi official, executed for war crimes
 Diego García-Borreguero, Director of the Sleep Research Institute in Madrid, Spain
 Karl Gebhardt (1897–1948), Nazi SS physician who conducted criminal medical experiments; executed for war crimes
 Helmut Gernsheim, photo-historian, collector, and photographer
 Gerd Gigerenzer, psychologist
 Claus Guth (born 1964), theatre and opera director
 Yvonne Hackenbroch (1912–2012), British museum curator and historian of jewellery (last Jew to earn a PhD there before World War II)
 Wolfhart Hauser, businessman, chief executive of Intertek
 Rudolf Hess, Nazi official acting as Adolf Hitler's deputy in the Nazi Party
 Werner Herzog, film director
 Rolf Hofmeier, (born 1939), German economist and Africanist
 Ödön von Horváth, German-writing Austro-Hungarian-born playwright and novelist
 Waldemar Hoven (1903–1948), Nazi physician executed for war crimes
 Edward Rand, American medievalist
 Sara Murray Jordan, American gastroenterologist
 Andreas Kaplan, German University professor and Rector
 Alexander Kekulé, German doctor and biochemist
 Inga Koerte,  neuroradiologist, scientific researcher and medical academic
 Ernst Lengyel, gynecologic oncologist, scientific researcher and medical academic
 Christof Loy, opera director
 Xaver Landerer (1809-1885), one of the first chemistry professors in Modern Greece.
 Josef Mengele, SS officer and Auschwitz physician; earned a doctorate in anthropology
 Hercules Anastasios Mitsopoulos (1816-1892), father of modern natural sciences in Greece.
 Wolf-Dieter Montag (1924–2018), German physician, and international sports administrator 
 Humberto Fernández Morán, Venezuelan scientist, inventor of the diamond knife
 Dieter Nörr, scholar of ancient law
 Michael Otto, head of German Otto Group
 Sergey Padyukov, American architect
 Dušan David Pařízek, Czech theatre director
 John Piper, reformed theologian, author and pastor
 Otto Friedrich Ranke, physiologist
 Marko Sarstedt, Researcher and academic
 Berta Scharrer, U.S.-based endocrinologist and scientific researcher (d. 1995)
 Avinoam Shalem, Israeli art historian, director of the American Academy in Rome
 Carl Sternheim, German playwright and short story writer
 Antony Theodore, German poet and social worker
 Heinz Hermann Thiele, German billionaire businessman and the chairman of Knorr-Bremse
 Blake Ragsdale Van Leer, President of Georgia Tech and United States Army Officer
 Martin H. Wiggers, German economist, editor, author and businessman
 Cüneid Zapsu, Turkish businessman
 Gottlieb Olpp, medical missionary, research and author
 Bettina Bäumer (born 1940), Austrian-born Indian scholar and Indologist

References

Ludwig Maximilian University of Munich
Ludwig Maximilian University of Munich people
Ludwig Maximilian University of Munich